Potassium bifluoride is the inorganic compound with the formula . This colourless salt consists of the potassium cation and the bifluoride anion. The salt is used as an etchant for glass. Sodium bifluoride is related and is also of commercial use as an etchant as well as in cleaning products.

Synthesis and reactions
The salt was prepared by Edmond Frémy by treating potassium carbonate or potassium hydroxide with hydrofluoric acid:

With one more equivalent of HF,  (CAS#12178-06-2, m.p. 71.7 C) is produced:

Thermal decomposition of  gives hydrogen fluoride:

Applications

See also 
 Ammonium bifluoride
 Bifluoride anion

References

Inorganic compounds
Potassium compounds
Metal halides
Bifluorides
Alkali metal fluorides